Josephine Oppong Yeboah (born June 19, 1979) also known as Lady Joy is a Ghanaian broadcast journalist, gender advocate and news anchor. She is currently a senior news anchor, producer, senior reporter and regional editor/Coordinator at Metro TV Ghana. She is currently a member of GJA and also an international correspondent.

Early life and education 
Yeboah graduated with a Bachelor of Arts degree in Information Studies/Political Science from the University of Ghana and also a Diploma in Communication Studies from the Ghana Institute of Journalism (GIJ).

Career 
Yeboah was the country manager for Africa Watch Magazine. She was also the senior news Anchor and producer at E.TV Ghana and Sky 96.7 FM. She was also a Brong Ahafo regional correspondent for Joy FM. She was also the program's manager and host at Top FM (formerly Top Radio). She was also the host of Metro TV's Good Morning Ghana program.

Award 
In 2019, Yeboah won the Female Media Personality Award for her women empowerment campaigns.

Advocacy 
Yeboah has covered the UN Commission on the Status of Women and also the UN Convention on the Rights of Persons with Disabilities at the UN headquarters. She took part in an interview in the 2022 International Women's Day celebration where she said "when female media practitioners – who better understand the problems of women – take interest in highlighting the challenges of women in society, it would help in addressing same".

References 

Living people
Ghanaian journalists
Ghanaian women journalists
Ghana Institute of Journalism alumni
1979 births